Hécate is a 1982 French-Swiss drama film directed by Daniel Schmid. It is based on the 1954 novel Hecate and Her Dogs by Paul Morand. It was entered into the 33rd Berlin International Film Festival.

Cast
 Bernard Giraudeau as Julien Rochelle
 Lauren Hutton as Clothilde de Watteville
 Jean Bouise as Vaudable, consul de France
 Jean-Pierre Kalfon as Massard
 Gérard Desarthe as Le colonel de Watteville
 Juliette Brac as Miss Henry
 Patrick Thursfield as L'Anglais
 Suzanne Thau as La tenancière du bordel
 Raja Reinking as La fille du bar
 Mustapha Tsouli as Ibrahim
 Teco Celio as Le capitaine Berta
 René Marc as Le ministre
 Ernst Stiefel as Le capitaine russe

References

External links

1982 films
Swiss drama films
French drama films
1980s French-language films
1982 drama films
Films based on works by Paul Morand
Films directed by Daniel Schmid
French-language Swiss films
1980s French films